2012 in Malaysia is Malaysia's 55th anniversary of Malaysia's independence.

Incumbents

Federal level
Yang di-Pertuan Agong: Sultan Abdul Halim Muadzam Shah 
Raja Permaisuri Agong: Sultanah Haminah Hamidon
Deputy Yang di-Pertuan Agong: Sultan Muhammad V 
Prime Minister: Najib Razak
Deputy Prime Minister: Muhyiddin Yassin
Chief Justice: Arifin Zakaria

State level
  : 
 Sultan of Johor: Sultan Ibrahim Ismail
 Menteri Besar of Johor: Abdul Ghani Othman
  : 
 Sultan of Kedah: (Council of Regency of Kedah) Tunku Annuar (Chairman)  Tunku Sallehuddin (Members I)   Tunku Abdul Hamid Thani (Members II)  Tunku Puteri Intan Safinaz (Members III) 
 Menteri Besar of Kedah: Azizan Abdul Razak
  : 
 Sultan of Kelantan: Sultan Muhammad V (Deputy Yang di-Pertuan Agong)
 Menteri Besar of Kelantan: Nik Abdul Aziz Nik Mat
  : 
 Raja of Perlis: Tuanku Syed Sirajuddin
 Menteri Besar of Perlis: Md Isa Sabu
  : 
 Sultan of Perak: Sultan Azlan Shah
 Menteri Besar of Perak: Zambry Abdul Kadir
  : 
 Sultan of Pahang: Sultan Ahmad Shah
 Menteri Besar of Pahang: Adnan Yaakob
  : 
 Sultan of Selangor: Sultan Sharafuddin Idris Shah
 Menteri Besar of Selangor: Abdul Khalid Ibrahim
  : 
 Sultan of Terengganu: Sultan Mizan Zainal Abidin
 Menteri Besar of Terengganu: Ahmad Said
  : 
 Yang di-Pertuan Besar of Negeri Sembilan: Tuanku Muhriz
 Menteri Besar of Negeri Sembilan: Mohamad Hasan
  : 
 Yang di-Pertua Negeri of Penang: Abdul Rahman Abbas
 Chief Minister of Penang: Lim Guan Eng
  Malacca :
 Yang di-Pertua Negeri of Malacca: Mohd Khalil Yaakob
 Chief Minister of Malacca: Mohd Ali Rustam
  : 
 Yang di-Pertua Negeri of Sarawak: Abang Muhammad Salahuddin
 Chief Minister of Sarawak: Abdul Taib Mahmud
  : 
 Yang di-Pertua Negeri of Sabah: Juhar Mahiruddin
 Chief Minister of Sabah: Musa Aman

Events

January
1 January – At the stroke of midnight MST, Nasional FM (Radio Nasional) was officially opening ceremony nationwide, using the same national frequencies as the former Muzik FM and took over both of Muzik FM's frequencies, its announcers and DJs on Wisma Radio, Angkasapuri with a new slogan: Sentiasa di Hati (Always in the Heart) with national anthem played at midnight. with the first radio programme usually very first music radio Nasional 12-6 (radio simulcast network of all state and local radio stations by Radio RTM) and Astro Radio as Malaysian number one largest nationwide radio broadcasting network on four languages of Malaysia including Era FM (Malay), hitz fm (English), My FM (Mandarin Chinese), THR Raaga (Tamil), and THR Gegar (East Coast Peninsular).
8 January – Selangor State EXCO, Datuk Dr Hasan Mohamed Ali is sacked from PAS and the State EXCO.
9 January – Opposition leader Datuk Seri Anwar Ibrahim was found acquitted by the High Court for sodomy charges. Three people were injured in an explosion near the Kuala Lumpur Courts Complex in Jalan Duta.
28 January – Kuala Lumpur City Centre to Bukit Bintang Pedestrian Walkway was officially opening ceremony on air conditioner and Wi-Fi by Prime Minister of Malaysia Najib Razak.

February
1 February – Eight foreigners mainly Afghans and Iranian were missing after the long boat they were in capsized at Tanjung Semayong in Sedili, Johor.
5 February – Muar, also known as Bandar Maharani was declared as a royal town of Johor by Sultan Ibrahim Ismail of Johor.
18 February – Astro NJOI, the first free-to-air satellite television in collaboration with the government of Malaysia and Astro is launched such as Astro Awani, Astro AEC, Astro Prima, Astro Vaanavil, CCTV-4, Era FM, hitz fm, My FM, THR Raaga, THR Gegar, and Nasional FM was officially opening ceremony by CEO of Astro Rohana Rozhan.
25 February – Kuala Lumpur City Centre to Bukit Bintang Pedestrian Walkway was opened to public on full air conditioner and free Wi-Fi.

March
5 March – Two people were killed and more than a dozen were injured when a bus carrying 24 Indian nationals went out of control and overturned as it was coming down from Genting Highlands at Kilometre—of the Genting Sempah–Genting Highlands Highway, Pahang.
8 March – 5-year-old girl Nurul Nadira or Dirang who went missing, was found dead at an oil palm estate in Nusa Damai near Masai, Johor.
8 March – The new KTM Komuter's six-car-set trains, MyKomuter (KTM Class 92) is officially launched by the Malaysian Prime Minister, Najib Tun Razak.
15 March – The remains of the Royal Air Force personnel in the RAF Dakota C4 crash at Gua Musang, Kelantan on 25 August 1950, were laid to rest at the Commonwealth War Graves in Cheras, Kuala Lumpur.

April

1 April – WBC it was officially opening ceremony by the free-to-air terrestrial television station in Malaysia.
5 April – FA of Malaysia (FAM) deputy president Tan Sri Annuar Musa was suspended for 2½ years by the association’s disciplinary board in criticising the national team and coach Datuk K. Rajagobal.
11 April – Tuanku Abdul Halim Muadzam Shah of Kedah is installed as the 14th Yang di-Pertuan Agong for the second time at the new Istana Negara palace in Jalan Duta, Kuala Lumpur.
12 April – British Prime Minister, David Cameron visits Malaysia for the first time and meets the Prime Minister, Najib Tun Razak.
15 April – The opening of Malacca Golf Gallery in Malacca.
16 April – The Proton Prevé (codenamed P3-21A), Malaysia's first global car is launched.
17 April – Kazakhstan's President, Nursultan Nazarbayev visits Malaysia.
28 April – The Bersih 3.0 rally take place in Kuala Lumpur. More than 250,000 people take part in the rally. Police fired teargas and water cannon to the protestors near Dataran Merdeka and arrest more than 500 people in the demonstration.

May

11 May – The UMNO's 66th anniversary celebration is held at the National Stadium, Bukit Jalil, Kuala Lumpur. More than 100,000 UMNO members take part in this biggest event of the party's history.
13 May – Official launching of the Pengerang Integrated Petroleum Complex (PIPC) project or Refinery and Petrochemical Integrated Development (RAPID) project in Pengerang, Johor by the Sultan Ibrahim Ismail of Johor.
22 May – The establishment of Glulam Gallery in Johor Bahru, Johor.
27 May – Season 2 of BoBoiBoy, a Malaysian animated series, was premiered on TV3.
30 May – Malaysia Airlines (MAS) received its first Airbus A380.

June
 1 June – The Royal Commission of Inquiry (RCI) to tackle the problem of illegal immigrants in Sabah was set up.
7 June – Wedding Ceremony of Nurul Wahab married Eric Daniel Deep as honeymoon to briding ceremony with theme "Aura Paris" source of Harian Metro Kuala Lumpur Edition on next day.
9 June – The Sunway Bus Rapid Transit (Sunway BRT) project is officially launched by the Prime Minister, Najib Tun Razak. This will be the first bus rapid transit (BRT) in the country.
10 June – More than 30,000 people gathered at Istana Pasir Pelangi in Johor Bahru to pledge their support and loyalty to Sultan of Johor, Sultan Ibrahim Ismail.
15 June – Several parts of Peninsula Malaysia are affected by haze.
22 June – The Security Offences (Special Measures) Act 2012 was gazetted to replace the Internal Security Act (ISA).
26 June – The opening of Macau Gallery Malacca in Peringgit, Malacca.

July
26 July – One crew members was killed and three others were injured in an MV Bunga Alpinia 3 tanker explosion in Labuan.

August

27 July - 12 August – Malaysia competed at the 2012 Summer Olympics in London, United Kingdom. On August 5, Malaysian badminton player, Lee Chong Wei, won a silver medal for the second time. On August 9, Malaysian diver Pandelela Rinong won a bronze medal in the 10 metre diving platform for the first time. This was the first female Malaysian athlete to win a medal at the Olympics, as well as the first to win an Olympic medal in any sport other than Badminton.
10 August – Ops Selamat (formerly Ops Sikap) is launched by the Royal Malaysian Police.
31 August – The Himpunan Janji Ditepati gathering was held at Stadium Nasional, Bukit Jalil, Kuala Lumpur. It would set a world record of having one million tweets hashtaged #Merdeka55 containing messages of independence between 8:15 and 9:15pm.

September
 4 September – Two Malaysian medical students were killed in the road crash at Vladimir, Russia.
 11 September – The preliminary report of Malaysia Education Blueprint 2013-2025 was introduced. The government made the report based on public opinions about education in Malaysia. There are 11 areas of reform which will be made in 3 phases.
 13–15 September – The Duke and Duchess of Cambridge (William and Kate) were on a 3-day official visit to Malaysia, representing Elizabeth II for the Royal Jubilee celebrations.
 15 September – Legoland Malaysia in Nusajaya, Johor is opened to the public.
 16 September – The Malaysia Day celebrations was held at Lapangan Terbang Lama, Bintulu, Sarawak. This is the first such celebration held on a large scale in Sarawak.
 18 September – Mechanical heart girl, Tee Hui Yi, who went underwent a successful double heart transplant on 5 October 2007, died at the Batu Pahat Hospital at 10:02am after complaining of back and chest pains at about 7am.
 22 September – Muslims and non-Muslims in various parts of Malaysia made peaceful protests over the film Innocence of Muslims.
 22 September – The Automated Enforcement System (AES) came into force at all major roads, highways and expressways nationwide.
 23 September – The Urban Transformation Centre (UTC) for Kuala Lumpur at Pudu Sentral is officially launched.

October

 10 October – Six of family killed while two others were seriously injured when they car collided with an express bus at Kuantan-Kuala Terengganu road near Meraga Beris, Kijal, Terengganu.
15 October – The Framework Agreement on the Bangsamoro between the Philippine Government, the Malaysian government and Moro Islamic Liberation Front was signed which calls for the abolishing of the Autonomous Region in Muslim Mindanao, to be replaced with a new autonomous region called Bangsamoro within a two-year period.
20 October – Malaysian Moto3 rider, Zulfahmi Khairuddin wins the second place of the 2012 Malaysian Motorcycle Grand Prix.
25 October – The Kota Kinabalu International Airport (KKIA) was closed Thursday night after the runway lights malfunctioned, forcing several incoming and outgoing flights to be cancelled or rescheduled and leaving many passengers stranded.

November

5 November – Several parts of states in Peninsula Malaysia, Selangor, Malacca and Johor were hit by flash floods.
9 and 10 November – The wedding dinner reception of badminton players Lee Chong Wei and Wong Mew Choo was held at Kuala Lumpur Convention Centre.
12 November – The 1Malaysia Call Centre (603-8000 8000) is launched.
November – All buildings within the Pudu Prison complex were completely demolished to make way for redevelopment.
21 November – Four PROPEL workers were killed in the trailer crash at North–South Expressway Northern Route near Gopeng, Perak.

December

1 December – Five of family were killed in the MPV crash at Endau-Mersing road, Johor.
3 December – The first batch of the two Eurocopter's EC725 Cougar to the Royal Malaysian Air Force (RMAF).
8 December – Hotel Majestic in Kuala Lumpur reopens after 28 years in closure.
23 December – Four of family were killed in the car-bus crash at Kuala Terengganu–Kemaman road, Terengganu.
24–29 December – Several parts of the east coast Peninsula Malaysia were hit by flash floods. About 11,000 people were evacuated.
27–31 December – The Karnival Sayangi Selangor Yakini BN is held at I-City, Shah Alam, Selangor. Other carnival also begin in Dataran Kemerdekaan Shah Alam (Shah Alam Independent Square).
28 December – Landslides occurred at Bukit Setiawangsa, Kuala Lumpur.

National Day and Malaysia Day
National Day theme: 1Malaysia; 55 Tahun Merdeka Janji Ditepati (1Malaysia; 55 Years of Independence Promises Fulfilled)
Malaysia Day theme: Janji Ditepati Rakyat Sejahtera

National Day parade
Dataran Merdeka, Kuala Lumpur

Himpunan Janji Ditepati (Janji Ditepati gathering)
Stadium Nasional, Bukit Jalil, Kuala Lumpur

Malaysia Day celebrations
Lapangan Terbang Lama, Bintulu, Sarawak

Sports
24 February–4 March – Le Tour de Langkawi 2012
24 November–22 December – 2012 AFF Suzuki Cup

Deaths
20 January – Izwan Pilus – Malay singers
27 January – Razali Alias – former Selangor footballer
30 March – Raja Ashman Shah Ibni Sultan Azlan Shah – Raja Kecil Sulong of Perak
21 July – Ismail Hutson – President of Malaysian Zoological Society and veteran actor
15 August – Punch Gunalan (real name Panchacharan Gunalan) – former national badminton champion
4 September – Tan Sri Hamzah Abu Samah – Honorary Life President of Olympic Council of Malaysia
28 September – Tan Sri Abdul Ghani Minhat – football legend
4 December – R. Jeyanathan – broadcaster
22 December – Tun Dr Lim Keng Yaik – former Gerakan party president and the Energy, Water and Communications Minister

See also
 2012
 History of Malaysia
 List of Malaysian films of 2012
 2011 in Malaysia | 2013 in Malaysia

References

 
2010s in Malaysia
Years of the 21st century in Malaysia
Malaysia
Malaysia